Jay Silva (born May 25, 1981) is an Angolan-born American mixed martial artist currently competing in the Heavyweight division. A professional competitor since 2008, Silva has also formerly competed for the UFC, Bellator, the MFC, KSW, and Tachi Palace Fights.

Mixed martial arts career

Early career
Raised on the East Coast, Silva's interest in mixed martial arts developed after seeing the first season of The Ultimate Fighter, and he  subsequently trained under Renzo Gracie in Brazilian jiu-jitsu, having obtained the level of purple belt, and began a professional career in mixed martial arts. Silva was a Grapplers Quest Champion for both the Heavyweight and Absolute weight divisions.

Ultimate Fighting Championship
Competing primarily in smaller organizations, Silva received a call from the UFC to fill in as a last minute replacement for Dan Miller and made his debut against CB Dollaway at UFC Fight Night: Diaz vs. Guillard losing a unanimous decision.

Silva's next fight was against Chris Leben on January 11, 2010, at UFC Fight Night 20, losing via unanimous decision (30-27, 30-27, 30-27). Silva was released from the UFC along with Kyle Bradley after his loss at UFC Fight Night 20.

Bellator
Silva stepped in for Paulo Filho, who was set to fight the Bellator Middleweight Champion Hector Lombard in a Super Fight at Bellator 18. Silva was defeated via Knockout in just six seconds of the first round.

On May 14, 2011, Silva defeated Gemiyale Adkins at Bellator 44 via unanimous decision.

Independent promotions
Silva scored a first round KO over MMA veteran Jaime Jara at Tachi Palace Fights 7, ending the bout in 33 seconds.

On November 4, 2011, Silva lost a five round unanimous decision to Bristol Marunde in a bout for the Superior Cage Combat Middleweight Championship.

Silva next faced fellow UFC veteran Kendall Grove on February 16 in Las Vegas, Nevada under the Superior Cage Combat organization. He won the fight via technical submission due to an arm triangle choke in the second round.

Silva next fought on May 12, 2012 against Michał Materla at KSW 19 for the vacant Middleweight Championship. Silva lost the fight via majority decision.

Silva faced Michał Materla on September 28, 2013 at KSW 24 in a non-title rematch from KSW 19. Silva won via knockout due to punches in the second round.

Maximum Fighting Championship
On November 30, 2012 it was announced that Silva signed a multi-fight contract with Maximum Fighting Championship he was set to debut at MFC 36 “Reality Check” against Jacen Flynn on February 15, 2013 in Edmonton, Alberta, Canada. On February 11, 2013, MFC Announced Wes Swofford as Flynn's Replacement. Silva was defeated by Swofford via TKO due to an elbow and punches in 41 seconds of round one.

Silva faced Ultimate Fighter alumni Sam Alvey on May 10, 2013 at MFC 37 “True Grit”. Silva was defeated by Alvey via TKO due to punches in round three.

Other promotions
Silva faced Oscar Cota in a heavyweight bout at Golden Boy Promotions inaugural MMA event on November 24, 2018. He won the fight via technical submission in the third round.

Mixed martial arts record

|-
| Win
| align=center|12–12–1
| Oscar Cota
| Technical Submission (arm-triangle choke)
| Golden Boy Promotions: Liddell vs. Ortiz 3
| 
| align=center| 3
| align=center| 2:13
| Inglewood, California, United States
| 
|-
|Win
|align=center|11–12–1
|Zsolta Balla
|Decision (unanimous)
|Serbian Battle Championship 17
|
|align=center|3
|align=center|5:00
|Odzaci, Serbia
|
|-
|Loss
|align=center| 10–12–1
|Mariusz Pudzianowski
|Decision (majority)
|KSW 40: Dublin 
|
|align=center|3
|align=center|5:00
|Dublin, Ireland
|
|-
|Loss
|align=center| 10–11–1
|Tim Williams
|Decision (unanimous)
|CCFC 63
|
|align=center|3
|align=center|5:00
|Atlantic City, New Jersey
|
|-
|Win
|align=center|10–10–1
|Guram Mestvirishvili
|Decision (unanimous)
|Ring of Combat 54
|
|align=center|3
|align=center|5:00
|Atlantic City, New Jersey
|
|-
|Loss
|align=center| 9–10–1
|Aziz Karaoglu
|TKO (punches)
|KSW 31
|
|align=center|1
|align=center|1:48 
|Gdańsk, Poland
|
|-
|Draw
|align=center| 9–9–1
|Piotr Strus
|Draw (unanimous)
|KSW 29
|
|align=center|3
|align=center|5:00 
|Kraków, Poland
|
|-
|Loss
|align=center| 9–9
|Michał Materla
|Decision (unanimous)
|KSW 26
|
|align=center|3
|align=center|5:00
|Warszawa, Poland
|
|-
|Win
|align=center| 9–8
|Michał Materla
|KO (punches)
|KSW 24
|
|align=center|2
|align=center|4:05
|Łódź, Poland
|
|-
|Loss
|align=center| 8–8
|Sam Alvey
|TKO (punches)
|MFC 37
|
|align=center|3
|align=center|1:05
|Edmonton, Alberta, Canada
|
|-
|Loss
|align=center| 8–7
|Wes Swofford
|TKO (elbow & punches)
|MFC 36
|
|align=center|1
|align=center|0:41
|Edmonton, Alberta, Canada
|
|-
|Loss
|align=center| 8–6
|Michal Materla
|Decision (majority)
|KSW 19
|
|align=center|3
|align=center|5:00
|Łódź, Poland
|
|-
|Win
|align=center| 8–5
|Kendall Grove
|Technical Submission (arm-triangle choke)
|Superior Cage Combat 4
|
|align=center|2
|align=center|1:52
|Las Vegas, Nevada, United States
|
|-
|Loss
|align=center| 7–5
|Bristol Marunde
|Decision (unanimous)
|Superior Cage Combat 3
|
|align=center|5
|align=center|5:00
|Las Vegas, Nevada, United States
|
|-
|Win
|align=center| 7–4
|Gemiyale Adkins
|Decision (unanimous)
|Bellator 44
|
|align=center| 3
|align=center| 5:00
|Atlantic City, New Jersey, United States
|
|-
|Win
|align=center| 6–4
|Jaime Jara
|KO (punches)
|Tachi Palace Fights 7
|
|align=center| 1
|align=center| 0:33
|Lemoore, California, United States
|
|-
|Loss
|align=center| 5–4
|Hector Lombard
|KO (punch)
|Bellator 18
|
|align=center| 1
|align=center| 0:06
|Monroe, Louisiana, United States
|
|-
|Loss
|align=center| 5–3
|Chris Leben
|Decision (unanimous)
|UFC Fight Night: Maynard vs. Diaz
|
|align=center| 3
|align=center| 5:00
|Fairfax, Virginia, United States
|
|-
|Loss
|align=center| 5–2
|CB Dollaway
|Decision (unanimous)
|UFC Fight Night: Diaz vs. Guillard
|
|align=center| 3
|align=center| 5:00
|Oklahoma City, Oklahoma, United States
|
|-
|Win
|align=center| 5–1
|Ray Lizama
|KO (punches)
|Call to Arms 2
|
|align=center| 3
|
|Ontario, California, United States
|
|-
|Win
|align=center| 4–1
|Reggie Orr
|KO (flying knee)
|Call to Arms 1
|
|align=center| 2
|align=center| 1:41
|Ontario, California, United States
|
|-
|Win
|align=center| 3–1
|Mike Johnson
|TKO (punches)
|Extreme Challenge: Mayhem at the Marina
|
|align=center| 2
|align=center| 1:26
|Atlantic City, New Jersey, United States
|
|-
|Loss
|align=center| 2–1
|Plinio Cruz
|Decision (split)
|KAP: The Return of Macaco
|
|align=center| 3
|align=center| 5:00
|Newark, New Jersey, United States
|
|-
|Win
|align=center| 2–0
|Ozzy Avalos
|KO (knee)
|Sparstar Promotions: Battle of the Rising Stars
|
|align=center| 3
|align=center| 0:42
|Montebello, California, United States
|
|-
|Win
|align=center| 1–0
|Mark DaPolito
|Submission (rear naked choke)
|Ring of Combat 20
|
|align=center| 2
|align=center| 3:47
|Atlantic City, New Jersey, United States
|

References

External links
 Official MySpace
 
 

1981 births
Living people
Brazilian male mixed martial artists
American male mixed martial artists
Middleweight mixed martial artists
Mixed martial artists utilizing Brazilian jiu-jitsu
Brazilian practitioners of Brazilian jiu-jitsu
American practitioners of Brazilian jiu-jitsu
Sportspeople from Rio de Janeiro (city)
Brazilian expatriate sportspeople in the United States
Brazilian people of Angolan descent
American people of Angolan descent
Ultimate Fighting Championship male fighters